Berdi Beg or Berdibek was Khan of the Golden Horde from 1357 to 1359, having succeeded his father Jani Beg. Berdi Beg was the last khan to rule before the beginning of a long cycle of civil wars in the Golden Horde.

When Jani Beg conquered the Chupanid kingdom in Azerbaijan and northwestern Iran in 1357, he left his son Berdi Beg as viceroy in Tabriz. However, Jani Beg became seriously ill on his return home, and either at his prompting or on his own initiative, his officer Tughluq Beg secretly communicated this information to Berdi Beg. The latter immediately rushed home, with a mere 10 companions. Jani Beg's condition improved, and when he discovered his son's return he was concerned about Berdi Beg's intentions. Although Jani Beg's wife Toqai Toghlu Khatun, Berdi Beg's mother, reassured the khan that his son was no threat, worried about Jani Beg's suspicions, Tughluq Beg arranged for the khan's murder. 

Following Jani Beg's death on 22 July 1357, Berdi Beg was now declared khan. He followed the advice of Tughluq Beg and proceeded to eliminate all foreseeable opposition by ordering the execution of at least 12 of his closest kinsmen; one, his 8-month-old brother, he killed himself, by hurling the infant to the ground, despite the supplications for pity by their grandmother Taydula Khatun. While Berdi Beg was ruthless in eliminating his kinsmen, he appears to have retained the services of his father's administrators: three out of four emirs attested in Jani Beg's treaty with the Venetians in 1347 appear in Berdi Beg's treaty with the Venetians in 1358. Berdi Beg expanded the officialdom, increasing the number of emirs to six. 

Berdi Beg was unable or unwilling to maintain his control over Azerbaijan, which reverted to survivors of the Chupanid regime and became the object of competition among other regional powers. Tensions with the Venetians in the Crimea led to a new treaty between them and the Golden Horde in 1358. By the terms of the treaty, Berdi Beg allowed the Venetians to trade in Soldaia (Sudak) and lowered the tax on commercial transactions due to the khan. The Russian Orthodox clergy, notably Metropolitan Aleksej, also benefited from the khan's generosity, and in a diploma (yarliq) issued in November 1357, it recovered rights that had been taken away by Jani Beg: it revoked taxes on homes belonging to the Church and restored the independence of the ecclesiastical courts within the khan's territory.

According to later accounts, by eliminating so many of his kinsmen, Berdi Beg was responsible for the extinction of the line of Batu on his own death. In circumstances that remain unclear, Berdi Beg and his sinister advisor Tughluq Beg were murdered in August/September 1359, and Qulpa was made khan instead. However, according to Muʿīn-ad-Dīn Naṭanzī and Ötemiš-Ḥājjī, Berdi Beg died of illness; the most contemporary source, the Venetian notary Benedetto Bianco, writes that Berdi Beg went the way of all flesh, "viam universi carnis ingresso," and Qulpa became khan 4 days later. The Golden Horde's time of troubles, in which no less than 25 khans rose to the throne in 20 years, followed. Berdi Beg left a daughter, probably Tulun Beg Khanum (she later reigned in 1370-1371), who was married to Mamai and, subsequently, to Tokhtamysh, who executed her in 1386.

Genealogy
Genghis Khan
Jochi
Batu Khan
Toqoqan
Mengu-Timur
Toghrilcha
Uzbeg Khan
Jani Beg
Berdi Beg

See also
 List of Khans of the Golden Horde

References

 Gaev, A. G., "Genealogija i hronologija Džučidov," Numizmatičeskij sbornik 3 (2002) 9-55.
 Grekov, B. D., and A. J. Jakubovskij, Zolotaja orda i eë padenie. Moscow, 1950.
 Grigoriev, A. P., "Zolotoordynskie hany 60-70-h godov XIV v.: hronologija pravlenii," Istriografija i istočnikovedenie stran Azii i Afriki 7 (1983) 9-54.
 Howorth, H. H., History of the Mongols from the 9th to the 19th Century. Part II.1. London, 1880.
 Judin, V. P., Utemiš-hadži, Čingiz-name, Alma-Ata, 1992.
 May, T., The Mongol Empire. Edinburgh, 2018.
 Morgan, D., The Mongols. Oxford, 1986.
 Počekaev, R. J., Cari ordynskie: Biografii hanov i pravitelej Zolotoj Ordy. Saint Petersburg, 2010.
 Safargaliev, M. G., Raspad Zolotoj Ordy. Saransk, 1960.
 Thackston, W. M. (trans.), Khwandamir, Habibu's-siyar. Tome Three. Cambridge, MA, 1994.
 Tizengauzen, V. G. (trans.), Sbornik materialov, otnosjaščihsja k istorii Zolotoj Ordy. Izvlečenija iz arabskih sočinenii, republished as Istorija Kazahstana v arabskih istočnikah. 1. Almaty, 2005.
 Tizengauzen, V. G. (trans.), Sbornik materialov otnosjaščihsja k istorii Zolotoj Ordy. Izvlečenija iz persidskih sočinenii, republished as Istorija Kazahstana v persidskih istočnikah. 4. Almaty, 2006.

1359 deaths
Khans of the Golden Horde
14th-century monarchs in Europe
Mongol Empire Muslims
Year of birth unknown